The Ian Tomlin School of Music, established 1968, is situated within the grounds of Merchiston campus at Edinburgh Napier University, Edinburgh, Scotland. The school is home to the BMus (Classical) and BA (Popular) Music courses. The courses are taught over three or four years. The school also offers research PhDs within its Applied Music Research Centre, primarily around composition and technology.

Origins 
Course benefactor Dr Ian Tomlin had a long association with the music programme offered at Edinburgh Napier University. After initially making a donation to the establishment of the programme, he set up a permanent endowment that benefits students on the classical study stream. In addition, he set up the Malta/Napier Music Scholarship Trust, which gives young Maltese music students the chance to study performance and composition in Edinburgh. Upon his death in  2016, he left a further £750,000 bequest to the university.

Course Structure 
The first two years of the BMus course are divided equally between performance and academic study. All students take music history and harmony classes for the first two years as well as a one-hour weekly one-to-one instrumental/singing/composition lesson.

Both the BMus and BA courses afford students the opportunity to customise their programme to their own particular interests and talents.

References 

Edinburgh Napier University
Music schools in Scotland
Culture in Edinburgh